EMX (Eberhard Mattes eXtender; also known as emx+gcc) is a programming environment for MS-DOS and OS/2. It allows creating and executing of 32-bit mode applications, presenting a POSIX API and, on OS/2, access to the OS/2 APIs.

Contents 
The EMX package consists of:

 The emx.exe program, a DOS extender, that allows running a 32-bit mode application in DOS and emx.dll and helper dlls in single threaded (for DOS compatibility) and multithreaded forms for running under OS/2.
 A C library that provides a POSIX API, for use on both DOS and OS/2.
 Additional libraries for OS/2.
 Ports of the C and C++ compilers of GNU GCC, the GNU binutils, gdb, GNU make, and other tools for program development.
 Tools for creating OS/2 shared libraries.

History 
The latest version is emx 0.9d, released in 1998 and last updated in March 2001.

See also 
 Cygwin
 DJGPP
 MinGW

References

External links 
 Main emx+gcc download site 
 

DOS software
OS/2 software
DOS extenders